Ihosvany Hernández Rivera (born  in Havana) is a former Cuban male volleyball player. He was part of the Cuba men's national volleyball team. He competed with the national team at the 1992 Summer Olympics, 1996 Summer Olympics and 2000 Summer Olympics in Sydney, Australia, finishing 7th.

Clubs
 Ciudad de Habana (1994-)

See also
 Cuba at the 1992 Summer Olympics
 Cuba at the 1996 Summer Olympics
 Cuba at the 2000 Summer Olympics

References

External links
 profile at sports-reference.com

1972 births
Living people
Cuban men's volleyball players
Volleyball players at the 1992 Summer Olympics
Volleyball players at the 1996 Summer Olympics
Volleyball players at the 2000 Summer Olympics
Olympic volleyball players of Cuba
People from Havana
Resovia (volleyball) players
Pan American Games medalists in volleyball
Pan American Games gold medalists for Cuba
Pan American Games bronze medalists for Cuba
Medalists at the 1991 Pan American Games
Medalists at the 1995 Pan American Games
Medalists at the 1999 Pan American Games
20th-century Cuban people